De La Salle High School is a private Roman Catholic school for boys run by the De La Salle Christian Brothers of the District of San Francisco in Concord, California, United States. It is located in the Roman Catholic Diocese of Oakland. The school was founded in 1965 by the De La Salle Brothers. De La Salle currently enrolls 1,039 students, and roughly 99% of each graduating class goes on to attend a university or college. It is home to the Spartans, the athletic varsity teams of the school and its school colors are green and silver. The school motto is "Les Hommes De Foi", French for "Men Of Faith", which is based on the order's Latin motto "Signum Fidei".

Athletics

Football
De La Salle High School is well-known in Northern California for its football team. The team, when coached by Bob Ladouceur, holds the national record 151-game winning streak spanning from 1992 to 2004. The streak ended when they were defeated on September 4, 2004, by Bellevue High School (Washington), outside Seattle. De La Salle finished the 2007 football season 13–0 and as state champions. In 2009, De La Salle defeated Crenshaw 28–14 to win the state title again. In 2010, De La Salle defeated Servite, ranked #7 in the nation, 48–8, to win the state title game for a second straight year. De La Salle finished the season 14–0 and ranked #1 in the nation by Maxpreps.

During the winning streak, De La Salle was named national champion in seven different years; once by ESPN (1994), five times by USA Today (1998, 2000, 2001, 2002, and 2003), and once by the National Sports News Service (1999). The Spartans have been named national champions by ESPNRISE.com (formerly Student Sports) six times, including four straight years (2000–03). They have also been honored as the top team in California 19 times (1992, 1994–2003, 2007, 2009–2012, 2014–2015) and competed in 25 California Interscholastic Federation (CIF) North Coast Section (NCS) championship games with 23 victories (12 of which were attained during the 151-game winning streak). For the 2008–2009 school year, De La Salle was ranked the 18th best high school football team in the country by USA Today, the 37th by ESPNRISE, the 19th by MaxPreps, and the 14th by Sports Illustrated.

In recent years, the team has won the California Open Division State Championships six times (2009, 2010, 2011, 2012, 2014, and 2015). They have appeared in the Open Division state title game every year from the founding of the division in 2008 until 2019. Prior, they had competed in Division I, where they were the 2007 State Champions and the 2006 and 2008 runner-up. They have won the North Coast Section championships every year since 1992, with the league's restructuring. From 1991 to 2021, they had a streak of 318 games without a loss when playing Northern California schools (going 316–0–2). This ended on September 10, 2021, when they lost to St. Francis High School of Mountain View. The Lancers, coached by St. Francis alum Greg Calcagno, beat De La Salle in the closing seconds of the game by the score of 31-28.

Campus ministry and spirituality

In the minds of the Brothers, "For Lasallian establishments to be the living expression of the Good News, they must be places for dialogue in truth, freedom, and hope."
 

Freshmen are introduced to the concept and experience retreat as a year group, spending the day together. Sophomores focus on the social justice aspect of the Gospel by working in the Tenderloin area of San Francisco. Juniors participate in a two-day residential which concentrates on making good moral decisions. Seniors take part in a four-day residential retreat (Kairos) which seeks to have them deepen their faith by examining their relationship with themselves, with others and with God.

Throughout the academic year students and staff have the opportunity to gather for prayer before school commences, to participate in the celebration of the Eucharist and to pause for prayer and reflection before classes. Those students wishing to further their spiritual development may participate in the Lasallian Youth movement. The school also runs father/son and parent/son retreats each year.

De La Salle Concord sponsors Nativity school in Shinara, Eritrea. Members of the upper school may also participate in "Ven a Ver" (Come to See), which involves spending five days with the disadvantaged people of Salinas or Tijuana.

In media 
The De La Salle football team was the subject of two 2003 books. One Great Game: Two Teams, Two Dreams, in the First Ever National Championship High School Football Game, by Don Wallace, follows the undefeated 2001 season and national championship showdown with Long Beach Polytechnic High School, and splits its focus between the schools. When the Game Stands Tall was written by Contra Costa Times sportswriter Neil Hayes, who followed the team for practices, games, and meetings during its undefeated 2002 season. The foreword was written by former Oakland Athletics and St. Louis Cardinals manager Tony LaRussa. Don Wallace also wrote about De La Salle and Ladouceur in an article called "The Soul of a Sports Machine", published in the October 2003 edition of Fast Company magazine.

The 2014 movie When the Game Stands Tall is based on Hayes' book.

Notable alumni

American football

Devin Asiasi, tight end for the New England Patriots
Doug Brien, former kicker in the National Football League
T. J. Carrie, former cornerback for the Cleveland Browns and Oakland Raiders
Isaiah Foskey, American football defensive end for the Notre Dame Fighting Irish
Matt Gutierrez, former NFL quarterback
Austin Hooper, NFL tight end for the Tennessee Titans
Maurice Jones-Drew, former running back for the Jacksonville Jaguars and Oakland Raiders
Derek Landri, former defensive tackle for the Philadelphia Eagles
David Loverne, former guard for the New York Jets
Tosh Lupoi, current defensive coordinator for the University of Oregon and former defensive coordinator for University of Alabama
Kevin Simon, former linebacker for the Washington Redskins
Aaron Taylor, former offensive lineman for Green Bay Packers
Amani Toomer, former wide receiver for the New York Giants
T. J. Ward, former NFL safety
Terron Ward, former NFL running back
Demetrius Williams, former NFL wide receiver
D. J. Williams, middle linebacker for the Denver Broncos and Chicago Bears
Dylan Wynn, professional football player for the Hamilton Tiger-Cats
Henry To'oTo'o, linebacker for the Alabama Crimson Tide

Other sports

John Baker, professional baseball player
Brent Barry, professional basketball player
Drew Barry, professional basketball player
Jon Barry, professional basketball player
Chris Carter, professional baseball player
Stefan Frei, professional soccer player
Kristian Ipsen, Olympic diver, bronze medalist
Mike Miller, professional baseball player
A. J. Puckett, professional baseball player
Dino Waldren, plays rugby for the U.S. national team 
Chris Wondolowski, professional soccer player with the U.S. national team
Stephen Wondolowski, professional soccer player
Douglas Strazza, professional lacrosse player (undrafted 2018)

Other
Charley Koontz, actor

Notes

Further reading

External links
De La Salle homepage
Christian Brothers District of San Francisco

Educational institutions established in 1965
Lasallian schools in the United States
Roman Catholic Diocese of Oakland
Catholic secondary schools in California
Boys' schools in California
Buildings and structures in Concord, California
High schools in Contra Costa County, California
1965 establishments in California